Christoph Wilhelm Megander (1626 – 22 August 1676 in Sommersdorf) was a German Protestant theologian.

Life 
From 1653 to 1671 he served as chaplain in the Norburg and confessor to Duchess consort Eleanor of Schleswig-Holstein-Sønderburg-Norburg, née Princess of Anhalt-Zerbst (10 November 1608 in Zerbst – 2 November 1681 in Osterholm).  She married Duke Frederick as his second wife in 1632.

In 1671, he went to the Duchy of Magdeburg and became a vicar in Sommersdorf.  He held this post until his death in 1676.

Megander was married and had one daughter.

References 
 Pfarrbuch der Kirchenprovinz Sachsen, vol. 6 Biogramme Me-P, Leipzig: Evangelische Verlagsanstalt, Leipzig, 2006,  - 

German Protestant theologians
1626 births
1676 deaths
17th-century German people
German male non-fiction writers